Sandro Henrique Alves Soares, better known as Sandrinho (born 3 April 1992), is a Brazilian footballer who plays as a forward or winger for Sport Recife.

Honours 
Sport Recife
Copa do Nordeste: 2014
Campeonato Pernambucano: 2014

References

External links

1992 births
Living people
Brazilian footballers
Association football forwards
Association football wingers
Sport Club do Recife players
Campeonato Brasileiro Série A players
Campeonato Brasileiro Série B players